Trumbull High School is a large public high school located in Trumbull, Connecticut. The current principal is Marc Guarino.

History

Trumbull High School was founded in 1961 following a population increase in Trumbull during the 1950s. It was originally located at 4630 Madison Avenue, in the building currently serving as Madison Middle School. As the 1960s progressed, the town was compelled to commission a new high school to accommodate further population growth.

In 1971 a new school was constructed at 72 Strobel Road, offering a then-modern auditorium (originally designed as a lecture hall), two-story media center, and athletic complex. Middlebrook Junior High School was converted to Middlebrook Elementary School, and the Madison Avenue complex was converted to Madison Junior High School.

Trumbull High School housed grades 10–12 until 1987–1988 when ninth-graders were moved to the high school, and sixth-graders were moved to the Madison and Hillcrest middle schools.

Facilities

Academic 
The main building contains two floors of classrooms, labs, and offices. It can take as much as 5 minutes to cross the interior of the main building.

An Agrisiceinec and Biotechnology building is located on campus and contains classrooms, labs, a greenhouse, as well as a working farm.

Athletic 
The school has an American Football field known as McDougal stadium. It also hosts 6 tennis courts, 5 baseball and softball fields, and joint soccer and lacrosse stadium.

Achievements

Marching band

MAC Class IV Champions 2001, 2003; Class V Champions 2006, 2007, 2010, 2011, 2015
United States Presidential Inaugural Parade – 2001, 2009
MAC Scholastic Marching Open Winter Percussion Champions 2008, 2018
WGI Percussion World Championships SO Finalists 2006, 2007, 2008, 2009, 2010, 2011, 2012, 2013, 2014, 2015, 2016, 2017, 2018
WGI Percussion World Championships SO Finalists – Silver Medalists 2008, 2009
WGI Colorguard World Championships SW Finalists 2007, 2009, 2010, 2011, 2012, 2013, 2014, 2015, 2017, 2018
WGI Colorguard World Championships SO Class Bronze Medalists 2006, SW Class Silver Medalists 2018<ref
name="musicalartsconference1"/>
EMBA Class III Gold Division Champions 2000
1997 Bands Of America – Division AA Class Champions
2016 Bands Of America - Division AAA Class Champions
2016 Bands Of America - Regional Champions 
1997, 2017 Macy's Thanksgiving Day Parade
1996,1997,1998,1999 EMBA Class V runner up
1992, 1994, 1995 EMBA Class IV Champions
2015 USBands – Class 6 Open Third Place Nationals
2016 USBands – Class 6 Open National Champions
2017 USBands - Class 6 Open Second Place Nationals

Sports

Boys Ice Hockey State Champions, 2012
Football State Champions 1977, 1985, 1986
Girls Soccer State Champions 1996–1999, 2001, 2006–08
Baseball State Champions, 1986, 1998
Girls Basketball Class 'LL' State Champion 1974
Boys Basketball Class 'LL' State Finalist 1974
Field Hockey Class 'L' State Champions 1986
Boys Volleyball State Champions 2001
American Scholastic Press Association "Most Outstanding High School Yearbook" 2004, 2005
We the People Connecticut State Champions (1988, 1991, 1992, 1994-1997, 1999-2007, 2012-2019, 2022, 2023) 
We the People Top Ten in the Nation (2003, 2005, 2007, 2013, 2016, 2022) Best in Northeast (1992, 2002, 2006, 2012, 2015, 2019)
Math Team – Connecticut State Champions(2005), Top Ten in New England (2005, 2006)

Notable alumni

 Paul Catanese - author
 Roger Friedman (1975) – gossip columnist, fired by Fox News
 Tony Horton (1976) – exercise instructor best known for P90X
 Mark Longwell (1978) – All-New England soccer player at Fairfield University who went on to compete for the US men's national soccer team and Tampa Bay Rowdies
Harold Jensen (1983) – player on Villanova University's 1985 NCAA championship basketball team, who played a key role in the championship game versus Georgetown
 Craig Breslow (1998) – professional baseball pitcher for the Cleveland Indians, Boston Red Sox, Minnesota Twins, Oakland A's, San Diego Padres, Arizona Diamondbacks, and Miami Marlins; Assistant General Manager/Vice President, Pitching for the Chicago Cubs 
 Jamie D'Antona (2001) – former MLB player for the Arizona Diamondbacks
 Manya Makoski (2002) – professional soccer player for the Los Angeles Sol, Atlanta Beat, and Sky Blue FC.

Notes

External links
 

Buildings and structures in Trumbull, Connecticut
Educational institutions established in 1961
Schools in Fairfield County, Connecticut
Public high schools in Connecticut
1961 establishments in Connecticut